František Fuhrherr-Nový (31 October 1903 – 22 January 1985) was a Czech athlete. He competed in the men's pole vault at the 1924 Summer Olympics.

References

External links

1903 births
1985 deaths
Athletes (track and field) at the 1924 Summer Olympics
Czech male pole vaulters
Olympic athletes of Czechoslovakia
People from Bystřice pod Hostýnem
Sportspeople from the Zlín Region